Yên Minh is a rural district of Hà Giang province in the Northeast region of Vietnam. As of 2019 the district had a population of 97 553. The district covers an area of 782 km². The district capital lies at Yên Minh.

Administrative divisions
Yên Minh District consists of the district capital, Yên Minh, and 17 communes: Bạch Đích, Đông Minh, Du Già, Du Tiến, Đường Thượng, Hữu Vinh, Lao Và Chải, Lũng Hồ, Mậu Duệ, Mậu Long, Na Khê, Ngam La, Ngọc Long, Phú Lũng, Sủng Thài, Sủng Cháng, and Thắng Mố.

References

Districts of Hà Giang province
Hà Giang province